The Freeman Plat Historic District is a residential historic district on the East Side of Providence, Rhode Island. It is roughly bounded by Sessions Street, Morris Avenue, Laurel Avenue, and Wayland Avenue, and consists of a network of generously-landscaped winding roads, laid out in consultation with the Olmsted Brothers design firm. The houses built are generally of high quality, many of them architect-designed, with architecturally diverse revival styles popular at the time. The area was developed between 1916 and 1929 by John Freeman, who owned a country estate in the area, and sought a way to develop the largely swampy tract.

The district was listed on the National Register of Historic Places in 1995.

See also
National Register of Historic Places listings in Providence, Rhode Island

References

Historic districts in Providence County, Rhode Island
National Register of Historic Places in Providence, Rhode Island
Geography of Providence, Rhode Island
Historic districts on the National Register of Historic Places in Rhode Island